Diana Aydosova (born 5 September 1995) is a Kazakhstani race walker. She competed in the women's 20 kilometres walk event at the 2016 Summer Olympics.

References

External links
 

1995 births
Living people
Kazakhstani female racewalkers
Place of birth missing (living people)
Athletes (track and field) at the 2016 Summer Olympics
Olympic athletes of Kazakhstan
21st-century Kazakhstani women